This is a bibliography of U.S. congressional memoirs by former and current U.S. representatives.
The United States House of Representatives is one of the two houses of the United States Congress, the bicameral legislature which also includes the Senate.

The composition and powers of the House are established in Article One of the Constitution. The major power of the House is to pass federal legislation that affects the entire country, although its bills must also be passed by the Senate and further agreed to by the President before becoming law (unless both the House and Senate re-pass the legislation with a two-thirds majority in each chamber). Each state receives representation in the House in proportion to its population but is entitled to at least one representative. The total number of voting representatives is fixed by law at 435. Each representative serves for a two-year term. The Speaker of the United States House of Representatives, traditionally the leader of the majority party, is the presiding officer of the chamber, elected by the members of the House.

Congressional memoirs

See also

 U.S. senator bibliography (congressional memoirs)
 List of American political memoirs

Notes

Books about American politicians

Political bibliographies